The 2009–10 SEC women's basketball season began with practices in October 2009, followed by the start of the 2009–10 NCAA Division I women's basketball season in November. Conference play started in early January 2010 and concluded in March, followed by the 2010 SEC women's basketball tournament at the Gwinnett Center in Duluth, Georgia.

Preseason

Preseason All-SEC teams

Coaches select 5 players
Players in bold are choices for SEC Player of the Year

Rankings

SEC regular season

Postseason

SEC tournament

Honors and awards

All-SEC awards and teams

References

 
Southeastern Conference women's basketball seasons